Quiet Girl with a Credit Card is the debut album from Australian singer-songwriter Lisa Miller. It was released in Australia in 1996 on the W.Minc label and licensed for release in Europe by Demon Records. It was produced by Graham Lee (ex-The Triffids) who had previously played pedal steel guitar in Lisa's roots-rock band Truckasaurus.

The album features Lisa's own compositions, plus two songs by Melbourne friends (one each from Dave Graney and Conway Savage), and two US classics: Bob Dylan's "You're a Big Girl Now" and Dan Penn's "Woman Left Lonely".

Track listing
"Big American Car"
"You're a Big Girl Now" (Bob Dylan)
"Guitar Boat"
"Nobody's An Angel"
"I'm Gonna Live My Life (I'm Gonna Take My Time)" (Dave Graney)
"Hang My Head"
"Woman Left Lonely" (Dan Penn/Spooner Oldham)
"False Waltz"
"Long Wide Load"
"Too Dark To See" (Conway Savage)
"Big Small Town"

All compositions by Lisa Miller except where noted.

1996 debut albums
Lisa Miller (singer-songwriter) albums